Harry James William Hughes (24 May 1876 – 5 November 1929) was an Australian rules footballer who played with Melbourne in the Victorian Football League (VFL).

Notes

External links 
	

1876 births
1929 deaths
Australian rules footballers from Victoria (Australia)
Melbourne Football Club players
People educated at Wesley College (Victoria)
Melbourne Football Club (VFA) players